James Edwin Powell (August 30, 1859 – November 20, 1929) was a professional baseball first baseman in 1884 and 1885. He was born in Richmond, Virginia, and died in Butte, Montana.

External links

1859 births
1929 deaths
Richmond Virginians players
Philadelphia Athletics (AA) players
Major League Baseball first basemen
Baseball players from Richmond, Virginia
19th-century baseball players
Richmond Virginians (minor league) players
Charleston Seagulls players
Sioux City Corn Huskers players
Omaha Lambs players
Butte Smoke Eaters players